"This Friendly World" is a song first performed by Fabian in the late 1950s. The text of "This Friendly World" was written by lyricist Ken Darby. The song reached #12 on the US charts.

The song is noted for being performed by entertainer Andy Kaufman. In Man on the Moon, a movie dedicated to Andy Kaufman, "This Friendly World" was performed during Kaufman's funeral by Jim Carrey. A different version by Carrey and Michael Stipe, appears on the film's soundtrack.

References

1950s songs
Song articles with missing songwriters